Machaerium nicaraguense is a species of flowering plant in the family Fabaceae. It is found in Honduras and Nicaragua.

References

nicaraguense
Flora of Honduras
Flora of Nicaragua
Endangered plants
Plants described in 1986
Taxonomy articles created by Polbot